Lyon Metro rolling stock

The MCL 80 (Métro Crémaillère Lyon 1980) is the Electric Multiple Unit type used on the Lyon Metro's Line C. All five trains were built by Alstom (then Alsthom) and Swiss Locomotive and Machine Works and were delivered and entered service in 1984. This train model is the only model of the Lyon Metro using steel wheels, rather than rubber tyres.

Electric multiple units of France
750 V DC multiple units
Alstom multiple units